The WTA Tour is the elite tour for professional women's tennis organised by the Women's Tennis Association (WTA). The 1996 WTA Tour included the four Grand Slam tournaments, the WTA Tour Championships and the WTA Tier I, Tier II, Tier III and Tier IV events. ITF tournaments are not part of the WTA Tour, although they award points for the WTA World Ranking.

Schedule 
The table below shows the 1996 WTA Tour schedule.

Key

January

February

March

April

May

June

July

August

September

October

November

Statistical Information 
These tables present the number of singles (S), doubles (D), and mixed doubles (X) titles won by each player and each nation during the season, within all the tournament categories of the 1996 WTA World Tour: the Grand Slam tournaments, the Year-end championships and the Tier I, Tier II, Tier III and Tier IV tournaments. The players/nations are sorted by:

 total number of titles (a doubles title won by two players representing the same nation counts as only one win for the nation);
 highest amount of highest category tournaments (for example, having a single Grand Slam gives preference over any kind of combination without a Grand Slam title); 
 a singles > doubles > mixed doubles hierarchy; 
 alphabetical order (by family names for players).

Titles won by player 

List of players and singles titles won, last name alphabetically:
  Steffi Graf – Indian Wells, Miami, Berlin, French Open, Wimbledon, US Open, WTA Championships (7)
  Monica Seles – Sydney, Australian Open, Eastbourne, Montreal, Tokyo (Tier II) (5)
  Jana Novotná – Madrid, Zurich, Chicago, Philadelphia (4)
  Ruxandra Dragomir – Budapest, Karlovy Vary, Pattaya City (3)
  Anke Huber – Rosmalen, Leipzig, Luxembourg (3)
  Kimiko Date – Tokyo (Tier III), San Diego (2)
  Lindsay Davenport – Strasbourg, Manhattan Beach (2)
  Julie Halard-Decugis – Hobart, Paris (2)
  Martina Hingis – Filderstadt, Oakland (2)
  Iva Majoli – Tokyo (Tier I), Essen (2)
  Conchita Martínez – Rome, Moscow (2)
  Arantxa Sánchez Vicario – Hilton Head, Hamburg (2)
  Shi-Ting Wang – Surabaya, Beijing (2)
  Sandra Cacic – Auckland (1)
  Meredith McGrath – Birmingham (1)
  Henrieta Nagyová – Warsaw (1)
  Barbara Paulus – Maria Lankowitz (1)
  Gloria Pizzichini – Bol (1)
  Lisa Raymond – Quebec City (1)
  Barbara Schett – Palermo (1)
  Brenda Schultz-McCarthy – Oklahoma City (1)
  Irina Spîrlea – Amelia Island (1)
  Dominique Van Roost – Cardiff (1)
  Linda Wild – Jakarta (1)

The following players won their first title:
  Sandra Cacic
  Gloria Pizzichini
  Ruxandra Dragomir
  Dominique Van Roost
  Barbara Schett
  Henrieta Nagyová
  Martina Hingis
  Lisa Raymond

Rankings 
Below are the 1996 WTA year-end rankings in both singles and doubles competition:

See also 
 1996 ATP Tour

References 

 
WTA Tour
1996 WTA Tour